Carlo Emanuele Madruzzo (5 November 1599 – 15 December 1658) was the prince-bishop of Trento from January 1629 until his death.

Biography
He was born at the Castle of Issogne into the noble family of the Madruzzo, various members of which were also prince-bishops of Trento.

In his youth he studied grammar and rhetorics  in Munich and philosophy at  Ingolstadt in Jesuit schools. Later he moved to Perugia where he studied law. In 1619 he was called back to Trento, where his uncle, Cardinal  Carlo Gaudenzio Madruzzo, had chosen him as his assistant and successor as prince-bishop. In 1626 he took the vows. 

After obtaining the throne in Trento, he had to face a period of crisis caused by  the Thirty Years' War and by the tense relations between the Holy Roman Emperor and the Papacy. During his rule he was able to obtain a wider degree of freedom from the House of Habsburg. In 1631 he ominously fled the city, which had been struck by plague; Madruzzo attracted further criticism for his relationship with  a noblewoman, Claudia Particella. He repeatedly asked for a papal dispensation in order to be able her to marry  her. 

He died suddenly at Trento in December 1658.

References

External links
Page at Dizionario Biografico degli Italiani 

1599 births
1658 deaths
Carlo Emanuele
People from Aosta Valley
Prince-Bishops of Trent